Besalampy Airport  is an airport in Besalampy, Madagascar.

Airlines and destinations

References

Airports in Madagascar
Mahajanga Province